Augusta Downtown Historic District is a historic district that encompasses most of Downtown Augusta, Georgia and its pre-Civil War area.

It was listed on the National Register of Historic Places in 2004.

Notable historic sites
Downtown Augusta is home to many historical sites. Some of these include:
Academy of Richmond County - 1801 campus— Designed by Richard Clarke, completed in 1801-2 and was the first educational institute in the state. The two original buildings on Bay Street were wood-framed, and their deterioration led to the construction of the Telfair Street campus.
Augusta Cotton Exchange Building— built in the 1880s at the height of cotton production and trade in Augusta. Now a branch of Georgia Bank and Trust.
Church of the Most Holy Trinity
Congregation of B'nai Israel Synagogue - Opened in 1869 and the oldest standing synagogue in Georgia.
First Baptist Church of Augusta
First Presbyterian Church
Gertrude Herbert Institute of Art— Founded in 1937 and is the only independent non-profit visual arts school in the Augusta-Aiken metropolitan area.
Lamar Building— Built in 1913 and, with 16 floors, is the third tallest building in Augusta. It was designed by architect William Lee Stoddart.
Old Government House— Housed the seat of the local government from 1801 to 1821. Now a reception hall.
Old Medical College of Georgia Building— Housed the Medical College of Georgia from 1835 to 1913. Now a conference & events center for the medical school.
Sacred Heart Cultural Center— Built in 1900 and is a former Roman Catholic church. Now an events center.
St. Paul's Episcopal Church— Founded in 1750, it is the oldest church in Augusta. Was burned to the ground in 1916 with many other buildings. It was rebuilt in 1919.
United States Post Office and Courthouse

Downtown Augusta contains a large amount of historical homes, many being built in the 19th century. Some of these homes include:
Brahe House
Joseph Rucker Lamar Boyhood Home— Lamar resided here when he was studying law.
Phinizy Residence
Platt Fleming Walker d'Antignac House
Woodrow Wilson Boyhood Home— The residence of Woodrow Wilson until the age of 14.
Zachary Daniels House

See also

Broad Street Historic District (Augusta, Georgia)
History of Augusta, Georgia

References

External links
Downtown Historic District (AugustaGA.gov) — former district boundaries map (Note: map boundaries out-of-date, district now extends south to Walton Way)
Augusta Downtown Historic District
Historic Downtown Monuments — Augusta Chronicle Augusta history web series
Boyhood Home of Woodrow Wilson

Historic districts in Augusta, Georgia
Geography of Augusta, Georgia
Tourist attractions in Augusta, Georgia
Historic districts on the National Register of Historic Places in Georgia (U.S. state)
National Register of Historic Places in Augusta, Georgia